Black Love is an American docuseries created by filmmakers Codie Elaine Oliver and Tommy Oliver, featuring couples opening up about the joys, challenges and realities of love, marriage and romance in the black community. It premiered on August 29, 2017 on the Oprah Winfrey Network as the most-viewed unscripted series debut in the network's history.

A fifth season premiered on May 14, 2021. The sixth and final season premiered on July 23, 2022.

Episodes

Series overview

Season 1 (2017)

Season 2 (2018)

Season 3 (2019)

Season 4 (2020)

Season 5 (2021)

Awards and nominations

References

External links

Black Love Site

2010s American black television series
2010s American reality television series
2020s American black television series
2020s American reality television series
2017 American television series debuts
2022 American television series endings
English-language television shows
Oprah Winfrey Network original programming
American dating and relationship reality television series